German submarine U-620 was a Type VIIC U-boat built for Nazi Germany's Kriegsmarine for service during World War II.
She was laid down on 19 June 1941 by Blohm & Voss, Hamburg as yard number 596, launched on 9 March 1942 and commissioned on 30 April 1942 under Oberleutnant zur See Heinz Stein.

Design
German Type VIIC submarines were preceded by the shorter Type VIIB submarines. U-620 had a displacement of  when at the surface and  while submerged. She had two shafts and two  propellers.

U-620 was fitted with five  torpedo tubes (four fitted at the bow and one at the stern), fourteen torpedoes, one  SK C/35 naval gun, 220 rounds, and a  C/30 anti-aircraft gun. The boat had a complement of between forty-four and sixty.

Service history
The boat's career began with training at 8th U-boat Flotilla on 30 April 1942, followed by active service on 1 October 1942 as part of the 3rd Flotilla for the remainder of her service.

Wolfpacks
U-620 took part in five wolfpacks, namely:
 Luchs (27 September – 6 October 1942)
 Panther (6 – 11 October 1942)
 Leopard (12 – 19 October 1942)
 Südwärts (24 – 26 October 1942)
 Delphin (26 December 1942 – 13 February 1943)

Fate
U-620 was sunk on 13 February 1943 in the North Atlantic in position , by depth charges from a Royal Air Force (RAF) Consolidated Catalina of No. 207 Squadron RAF, for the loss of all hands.

Summary of raiding history

References

Bibliography

External links

German Type VIIC submarines
1942 ships
U-boats commissioned in 1942
Ships lost with all hands
U-boats sunk in 1943
U-boats sunk by depth charges
U-boats sunk by British aircraft
Maritime incidents in February 1943
World War II shipwrecks in the Atlantic Ocean
World War II submarines of Germany
Ships built in Hamburg